The 1967 All-Ireland Senior Hurling Championship was the 37th staging of the All-Ireland Minor Hurling Championship since its establishment by the Gaelic Athletic Association in 1928.

Wexford entered the championship as the defending champions.

On 3 September 1967, Cork won the championship following a 2-15 to 5-3 defeat of Wexford in the All-Ireland final. This was their 8th All-Ireland title, their first in three championship seasons.

Results

Leinster Minor Hurling Championship

First round

Quarter-finals

Semi-finals

Final

Munster Minor Hurling Championship

Quarter-finals

Semi-finals

Final

All-Ireland Minor Hurling Championship

Semi-final

Final

External links
 All-Ireland Minor Hurling Championship: Roll Of Honour

Minor
All-Ireland Minor Hurling Championship